The soundtrack album for the Bob Dylan biopic I'm Not There was released as a double CD on October 30, 2007. It features only one recording by Dylan himself—his previously unreleased  recording of the title song "I'm Not There" recorded during The Basement Tapes' sessions in 1967—plus various other artists' recordings of songs written by Dylan. These CDs do not contain the movie sound track.  Fragments from less than half of the titles are heard in the film, which features more of Dylan's own recordings. The end credits relay a complete list of music heard in the film.

A four-LP version was also released. It features the various artists on the record holding up the side numbers on cue cards, modeled after the "Subterranean Homesick Blues" scene from Dylan's 1967 film Dont Look Back.

A number of tracks feature backing by a supergroup called The Million Dollar Bashers, featuring Sonic Youth members Lee Ranaldo and Steve Shelley, Wilco guitarist Nels Cline, Television guitarist Tom Verlaine, Dylan bassist Tony Garnier, guitarist Smokey Hormel and keyboardist John Medeski.

Track listing

Disc One
 "All Along the Watchtower" – Eddie Vedder and The Million Dollar Bashers
 "I'm Not There" – Sonic Youth
 "Goin' to Acapulco" – Jim James and Calexico 
 "Tombstone Blues" – Richie Havens
 "Ballad of a Thin Man" – Stephen Malkmus and The Million Dollar Bashers
 "Stuck Inside of Mobile with the Memphis Blues Again" – Cat Power
 "Pressing On" – John Doe
 "4th Time Around" – Yo La Tengo and Buckwheat Zydeco
 "Dark Eyes" – Iron & Wine and Calexico
 "Highway 61 Revisited" – Karen O and The Million Dollar Bashers
 "One More Cup of Coffee" – Roger McGuinn and Calexico
 "The Lonesome Death of Hattie Carroll" – Mason Jennings
 "Billy 1" – Los Lobos
 "Simple Twist of Fate" – Jeff Tweedy
 "Man in the Long Black Coat" – Mark Lanegan
 "Señor (Tales of Yankee Power)" – Willie Nelson and Calexico

Disc Two
 "As I Went Out One Morning" – Mira Billotte
 "Can't Leave Her Behind" - Stephen Malkmus and Lee Ranaldo
 "Ring Them Bells" – Sufjan Stevens
 "Just Like a Woman" – Charlotte Gainsbourg and Calexico
 "Mama You've Been on My Mind" / "A Fraction of Last Thoughts on Woody Guthrie" – Jack Johnson
 "I Wanna Be Your Lover" - Yo La Tengo
 "You Ain't Goin' Nowhere" – Glen Hansard and Markéta Irglová
 "Can You Please Crawl Out Your Window?" – The Hold Steady
 "Just Like Tom Thumb's Blues" – Ramblin' Jack Elliott
 "The Wicked Messenger" – The Black Keys
 "Cold Irons Bound" – Tom Verlaine & The Million Dollar Bashers
"The Times They Are a-Changin'" – Mason Jennings
 "Maggie's Farm" – Stephen Malkmus & The Million Dollar Bashers
 "When the Ship Comes In" – Marcus Carl Franklin
 "The Moonshiner" – Bob Forrest
 "I Dreamed I Saw St. Augustine" – John Doe
 "Knockin' on Heaven's Door" – Antony and the Johnsons
 "I'm Not There" – Bob Dylan and The Band - recording from 1967

iTunes bonus tracks
 "Main Title Theme (Billy)" – Calexico
 "One Too Many Mornings" – Joe Henry
 "What Kind of Friend Is This" – Lee Ranaldo and Stephen Malkmus
 "Bunkhouse Theme" – Calexico

Critical reception

John Doe's version of "Pressing On" was ranked #52 by Rolling Stone on their 100 Best Songs of 2007 list, while Sonic Youth's cover of "I'm Not There" was ranked at #83 by Pitchfork Media on their Top 100 Tracks of 2007.

Notes
The song "I'm Not There" was itself written in 1967 during a recording session with The Band known as The Basement Tapes.  The song was part of the bootleg copies that circulated amongst Dylan fans for a number of years and when The Basement Tapes were released officially, the song, among others were not included.  Because of the source material and that Dylan has never been captured playing the song in concert, the lyrics are something of a mystery.

"Ballad of Hollis Brown," covered by The Stooges, plays while Jude Quinn writes songs, but is not included on the soundtrack.

References

Biographical film soundtracks
Bob Dylan tribute albums
2007 soundtrack albums
Columbia Records soundtracks